Winthrop Gilman Brown (July 12, 1907 – May 25, 1987) was an American lawyer and diplomat. He served in posts in Asia, including as United States Ambassador to South Korea from 1964 to 1967.

Biography

Winthop G. Brown was born in Seal Harbor, Maine on July 12, 1907 and was a son of Rev. William Adams Brown and Helen Gilman Noyes Brown. He earned his Bachelor of Arts degree at Yale University in 1927 and earned his Bachelor of Laws degree from Yale Law School. After graduating from Yale, he established a law practice in New York City, but later became a career diplomat, and the United States Ambassador to Laos from 1960 to 1962. From 1964 to 1967, he was the United States Ambassador to South Korea, during which he was heavily involved in negotiations with the South Korean government under Park Chung Hee to ensure Korean troops would send troops to the Vietnam War. His last post as diplomat was the Deputy Assistant Secretary for East Asian and Pacific Affairs, serving from 1968 to 1972. He died on May 25, 1987 in Washington D.C.

References

External links
 

Ambassadors of the United States to South Korea
Yale Law School alumni
1907 births
1987 deaths
People from Mount Desert Island
United States Career Ambassadors
Recipients of the President's Award for Distinguished Federal Civilian Service